The following is a list of American Football League (AFL) seasons since the inception of the league in 1960 to 1969, the year before it merged with the National Football League (NFL).

Note: W = Wins, L = Losses, T = Ties, PCT= Winning Percentage, PF= Points For, PA = Points Against

1960

AFL Championship Game
Houston Oilers 24, Los Angeles Chargers 16, January 1, 1961, Jeppesen Stadium, Houston, Texas

1961

The Chargers relocated from Los Angeles to San Diego prior to the season.

AFL Championship Game
Houston Oilers 10, San Diego Chargers 3, December 24, 1961, Balboa Stadium, San Diego, California

1962

AFL Championship Game
Dallas Texans 20, Houston Oilers 17 (2OT), December 23, 1962, Jeppesen Stadium, Houston, Texas

1963

The Dallas Texans relocated to Kansas City, Missouri and changed the team's name to the Kansas City Chiefs. Meanwhile, the New York Titans became the New York Jets. The AFL decided to postpone their games on November 24, due to the assassination of President John F. Kennedy two days earlier.

Eastern Division playoff
Boston Patriots 26, Buffalo Bills 8, December 28, 1963, War Memorial Stadium, Buffalo, New York
AFL Championship Game
San Diego Chargers 51, Boston Patriots 10, January 5, 1964, Balboa Stadium, San Diego, California

1964

AFL Championship Game
Buffalo Bills 20, San Diego Chargers 7, December 26, 1964, War Memorial Stadium, Buffalo, New York

1965

AFL Championship Game
Buffalo Bills 23, San Diego Chargers 0, December 26, 1965, Balboa Stadium, San Diego, California

1966

Prior to the season, the AFL-NFL Merger was announced, including both leagues agreeing to play an annual AFL-NFL World Championship Game (later known as the Super Bowl) beginning in January, 1967.

Also, the Miami Dolphins joined the AFL as an expansion team.

AFL Championship Game
Kansas City Chiefs 31, Buffalo Bills 7, January 1, 1967, War Memorial Stadium, Buffalo, New York
Super Bowl I 
Green Bay (NFL) 35, Kansas City (AFL) 10, at Los Angeles Memorial Coliseum, Los Angeles

1967

AFL Championship Game
Oakland Raiders 40, Houston Oilers 7, December 31, 1967, Oakland Coliseum, Oakland, California
Super Bowl II 
Green Bay (NFL) 33, Oakland (AFL) 14, at Miami Orange Bowl, Miami, Florida

1968

The Cincinnati Bengals joined the league as an expansion team.

Western Division playoff
Oakland Raiders 41, Kansas City Chiefs 6, December 22, 1968, Oakland Coliseum, Oakland, California 
AFL Championship Game
New York Jets 27, Oakland Raiders 23, December 29, 1968, Shea Stadium, New York City
Super Bowl III 
N.Y. Jets (AFL) 16, Baltimore (NFL) 7, at Miami Orange Bowl, Miami, Florida

1969

For its tenth and final season before merging with the NFL, the AFL instituted a four team playoff tournament with the second place teams in each division also participating.

Interdivisional playoffs
Kansas City Chiefs 13, New York Jets 6, December 20, 1969, Shea Stadium, New York City
Oakland Raiders 56, Houston Oilers 7, December 21, 1969, Oakland Coliseum, Oakland, California 
AFL Championship Game
Kansas City Chiefs 17, Oakland Raiders 7, January 4, 1970, Oakland Coliseum, Oakland, California
Super Bowl IV 
Kansas City (AFL) 23, Minnesota (NFL) 7, at Tulane Stadium, New Orleans, Louisiana

See also
List of NFL seasons
American Football League win–loss records

References
NFL Record and Fact Book
Total Football: The Official Encyclopedia of the National Football League

 
American Football League